Two Hearts That Beat as Ten is a 1915 short film starring Ben Turpin and Wallace Beery, produced by the Essanay Film Manufacturing Company, and distributed by the General Film Company. The supporting cast features Robert Bolder and Charlotte Mineau. The writer and director of the film currently remain unknown.

Cast
Wallace Beery	...	
Fred
Robert Bolder	...	
Archie
Betty Brown	...	
Mildred
Charlotte Mineau	...	
The Nurse
Ben Turpin

External links
 Two Hearts That Beat as Ten in the Internet Movie Database

1915 films
1915 short films
Essanay Studios films
American silent short films
American black-and-white films
1915 comedy films
1910s American films